Roy Williams  (born 7 March 1937) is an English jazz trombonist.

Early life
He was born in Salford, England. Williams learned piano as a youth and did not play the trombone until he was 18. He served his National Service in the military in the late 1950s, then joined the trad jazz group of trumpeter Mike Peters and worked with Terry Lightfoot in the early 1960s.

Career
In 1965, Williams became a member of Alex Welsh's band, which accompanied Ruby Braff, Wild Bill Davison, and Bud Freeman. Williams remained with Welsh until 1978, also collaborating with bandmate John Barnes in a side ensemble. He then worked with Humphrey Lyttelton (1978–1983), and in 1980 played with the Pizza Express All Stars and Benny Waters.

He left Lyttelton's ensemble in 1983 and was a regular performer at festivals in the 1980s and 1990s. He was a sideman for Doc Cheatham, Jim Galloway, Buddy Tate, the Harlem Blues and Jazz Band, the World's Greatest Jazz Band, Peanuts Hucko, Bent Persson, Bob Rosengarden, Stan Barker, Bob Wilber, Digby Fairweather, Pete Strange, and Keith Smith.

Williams co-led a swing-oriented quintet in 1998 with saxophonist Danny Moss.  Their musical collaboration produced Steamers! for the Nagel-Heyer Records label.

In July 2016 Williams performed at the Edinburgh Jazz Festival with bandleader John Burgess at a tribute concert entitled Remembering Alex Welsh.

Williams was appointed Member of the Order of the British Empire (MBE) in the 2020 Birthday Honours for services to jazz.

References

Bibliography
"Roy Williams". The New Grove Dictionary of Jazz. 2nd edition, ed. Barry Kernfeld.

1937 births
Living people
English jazz trombonists
Male trombonists
21st-century trombonists
21st-century British male musicians
British male jazz musicians
World's Greatest Jazz Band members
Harlem Blues and Jazz Band members
Hep Records artists
Members of the Order of the British Empire